is a single by Japanese singers Yōko Oginome and Masatoshi Ono. Written by Ono, the single was released on November 20, 1999, by Victor Entertainment.

Track listing
All songs are written by Masatoshi Ono; all music is arranged by Takehiro Kawabe.

References

External links

1999 singles
Yōko Oginome songs
Japanese-language songs
Victor Entertainment singles